This is a list of the National Register of Historic Places listings in Belknap County, New Hampshire.

This is intended to be a complete list of the properties and districts on the National Register of Historic Places in Belknap County, New Hampshire, United States. Latitude and longitude coordinates are provided for many National Register properties and districts; these locations may be seen together in a map.

There are 46 properties and districts listed on the National Register in the county.

Current listings

|}

See also

 List of National Historic Landmarks in New Hampshire
 National Register of Historic Places listings in New Hampshire

References
 

Belknap